People with the Al-Amuli surname include:

 Muhammad ibn Mahmud Amuli, 14th century Persian physician
 Haydar Amuli (1319–1385), Persian Shi'ite mystic and Sufi philosopher, born in what is now Iran
 Al-Natili, 10th century Persian physician and translator

See also 
 Amoli (disambiguation)

Arabic-language surnames
Amuli